The Tennessee College of Applied Technology-Northwest is one of 46 institutions in the Tennessee Board of Regents System, the seventh largest system of higher education in the United States.  This system comprises six universities, 14 community colleges, and 27 Colleges of Applied Technology.

History 

The General Assembly of the State of Tennessee in 1963 directed the State Board for Vocational Education to locate, establish, construct, and operate a statewide system of area vocational-technical schools.  The intent of this legislation was to meet more adequately the occupational training needs of citizens and residents of this state, including employees and future employees of existing and prospective industries and businesses.

In July 1994, a name change was passed by the legislature, and the Area Schools became the Tennessee Technology Centers to better reflect the trend toward the more advanced, technological training needed to supply skilled employees.

On July 1, 2013, Governor Bill Haslam signed Senate Bill SB0643 officially renaming all statewide technology centers to the Tennessee Colleges of Applied Technology.

The Tennessee College of Applied Technology-Northwest is a post-secondary and adult institution which provides programs to serve the training needs of a broad geographic area by providing technical instruction and skilled training in trade, technical, and other occupations.  The instructional programs are designed to prepare persons for employment and to upgrade the skills and knowledge of persons who have already entered the work force.

Office of the Tennessee Colleges of Applied Technology 

The headquarters of the TCATs is located in Nashville, Tennessee.  James King is the Vice Chancellor for the Colleges of Applied Technology.

Academic programs 

Each of the Tennessee Colleges of Applied Technology offers programs based on geographic needs of businesses and industry.  Therefore, each college can have different academic programs and offerings.  The following academic programs are available at TCAT-Northwest.

 Automotive Technology
 Drafting/CAD
 Electronics Technology
 Heating, Ventilation, Air Conditioning/Refrigeration (HVAC/R)
 Industrial Maintenance/Mechatronics
 Machine tool Technology
 Practical Nursing
 Welding Technology
 Cosmetology
 Truck Driving
 Diesel Powered Equipment Technology
 Injection Molding/Robotics

Student organizations 

The Tennessee College of Applied Technology-Northwest provides memberships and organizations for students, including the following:

 SkillsUSA
 National Technical Honor Society
 Student Government Association

Accreditation 

The Tennessee College of Applied Technology-Northwest is accredited by the Council of Occupational Education (COE), a regional accrediting agency of the Southern Association of Colleges and Schools (SACS).

References 

Education in Tennessee
Public universities and colleges in Tennessee